High Endoatmospheric Defense Interceptor (HEDI) was the atmospheric missile defense layer developed for the Strategic Defense Initiative, along with Exoatmospheric Reentry-vehicle Interceptor Subsystem. It consisted of a two-stage launch vehicle (booster) and an infrared homing kill vehicle with a conventional warhead. Hughes Aircraft and Aerojet were contractors, and McDonnell Douglas was the system integrator.

See also
Terminal High Altitude Area Defense

References

External links

Strategic Defense Initiative
Anti-ballistic missiles of the United States